Iredalea macleayi is a species of sea snail, a marine gastropod mollusk in the family Drilliidae.

Description

Distribution
This species occurs in the demersal zone off Queensland, Australia, New Guinea and Indonesia.

References
Citations

Bibliography
  Tucker, J.K. 2004 Catalog of recent and fossil turrids (Mollusca: Gastropoda). Zootaxa 682:1–1295

External links
  Charles Hedley, Some new or unfigured Australian shells; Records of the Australian Museum v. 4 (1901)

macleayi
Gastropods described in 1876